Pistakee Highlands is a census-designated place (CDP) in McHenry County, Illinois, United States. It consists primarily of an unincorporated area of McHenry County adjoining Pistakee Bay, within the McHenry post office, and is located just northeast of Johnsburg. Per the 2020 census, the population was 3,237.

Geography
Pistakee Highlands is located at  (42.401023, -88.210738).

Demographics

2020 census

2000 Census
As of the census of 2000, there were 3,812 people, 1,342 households, and 1,041 families residing in the CDP. The racial makeup of the CDP was 97.98% White, 0.13% African American, 0.26% Native American, 0.13% Asian, 0.68% from other races, and 0.81% from two or more races. Hispanic or Latino of any race were 3.31% of the population.

There were 1,342 households, out of which 39.9% had children under the age of 18 living with them, 63.3% were married couples living together, 9.7% had a female householder with no husband present, and 22.4% were non-families. 18.1% of all households were made up of individuals, and 5.4% had someone living alone who was 65 years of age or older. The average household size was 2.84 and the average family size was 3.23.

In the CDP, the population was spread out, with 28.9% under the age of 18, 7.1% from 18 to 24, 32.5% from 25 to 44, 23.4% from 45 to 64, and 8.1% who were 65 years of age or older. The median age was 35 years. For every 100 females, there were 103.6 males. For every 100 females age 18 and over, there were 98.8 males.

The median income for a household in the CDP was $54,943, and the median income for a family was $62,868. Males had a median income of $42,750 versus $30,504 for females. The per capita income for the CDP was $21,852. About 3.5% of families and 4.4% of the population were below the poverty line, including 4.1% of those under age 18 and 6.3% of those age 65 or over.

References

Census-designated places in Illinois
Chicago metropolitan area
Census-designated places in McHenry County, Illinois